Silverthrone can refer to one of the following:

 Mount Silverthrone (Alaska)
 Mount Silverthrone (British Columbia)
 Silverthrone Caldera (British Columbia)
 Silverthrone Glacier (British Columbia)